The Crawfordsville Bridge spans the Calapooia River adjacent to Oregon Route 228 near the community of Crawfordsville in Linn County, Oregon, United States.

The 105-foot Howe truss type bridge was built in 1932. The bridge was bypassed in 1963 and is now maintained by the Linn County Parks & Recreation Department as a pedestrian bridge across the river. Since 1990, the bridge has been the site of a Bridge Day festival held annually in the summer. A small park next to the bridge includes a picnic table and fire pit.

The bridge was featured in the 1976 television movie The Flood.

The bridge is listed on the National Register of Historic Places.

See also
 List of bridges on the National Register of Historic Places in Oregon

References

External links

Bridges completed in 1932
National Register of Historic Places in Linn County, Oregon
Covered bridges on the National Register of Historic Places in Oregon
Bridges in Linn County, Oregon
1932 establishments in Oregon
Road bridges on the National Register of Historic Places in Oregon
Wooden bridges in Oregon
Howe truss bridges in the United States